Beysky District (Khakas: , Pii aymağı) is an administrative and municipal district (raion), one of the eight in the Republic of Khakassia, Russia. It is located in the east of the republic. Its administrative center is the rural locality (a selo) of Beya. Population:  The population of Beya accounts for 27.2% of the district's total population. Beysky district is 18,71% Khakass (2010)

References

Notes

Sources

Districts of Khakassia